The 1st Air Defense Brigade (Hanja: 第一防空旅團) is a military formation of the Republic of Korea Army. It is subordinated to the Capital Defense Command(수도방위사령부). It headquartered in Gwacheon, Gyeonggi Province, and is responsible for defending the P-73A and P-73B areas of Seoul, the South Korean capital city.

History 
On 1 December 1986, the unit were established as 3rd Air Defense Brigade. The 3rd Air Defense Brigade was reorganized into the 1st Air Defense Brigade after being left with the Army when the Air Defense Command transferred to the Republic of Korea Air Force on 1 July 1991.  After that, the brigade was under the command of the Third ROK Army, and on 1 December 2011, it was merged with the 10th Air Defense Group and transferred to the Capital Defense Command.

Organization 
Headquarters (Gwacheon)
Maintenance unit
Airspace control company
Signal company
501st Air Defense Battalion
503rd Air Defense Battalion
505th Air Defense Battalion
507th Air Defense Battalion

Equipment 
 
Mistral
KM167A3
K-SAM Pegasus
KP-SAM Shingung
Oerlikon GDF
Low altitude detection radar

References 

Military units and formations established in 1986
Gwacheon
Military units and formations of the South Korean Army